"Rawhide" is a Western song written by Ned Washington (lyrics) and composed by Dimitri Tiomkin in 1958. It was originally recorded by Frankie Laine.  The song was used as the theme to Rawhide, a western television series that ran on CBS from 1959 to 1966. Members of the Western Writers of America chose it as one of the Top 100 Western songs of all time.

Background
The song is about the job of a drover on a cattle drive.

In other media
 In The Blues Brothers, the band performs "Rawhide" in a local country western bar.
 The song is played in a scene on An American Tail: Fievel Goes West, when the titular character is rolling through the desert inside a tumbleweed. The song is actually the cover reused from The Blues Brothers, mentioned above, performed by an uncredited Dan Aykroyd and John Belushi as various desert animals. However, the song is not heard on the soundtrack for copyright reasons.
 In My Favorite Martian, the sentient, wise-cracking metallic suit Zoot (voiced by an uncredited Wayne Knight) sings a verse of the song as he and fellow Martians Martin (Christopher Lloyd) and Neenert (Ray Walston) leave Earth on their spacecraft. 
 The song is parodied in the Histeria! episode "North America" as the Cowpie Song.
 In A Little Curious, episode Long, Short, Roll, there is a segment with a song that is a parody of "Rawhide".
 On The Simpsons, the Canyonero jingle featured in "The Last Temptation of Krust" is a parody. Additionally, in "Milhouse Doesn't Live Here Anymore", the song Homer, Lenny, and Carl sing while rolling on toxic barrels is sung to the tune of "Rawhide".
 In Shrek 2, Donkey (voiced by Eddie Murphy) is briefly heard singing the song; however, the song wasn't included in the soundtrack.
 In Happy Feet 2, the elephant seals were heard singing with an Australian accent while marching to the iceberg was included in the soundtrack.
 The theme song to the 1980 Japanese Super Sentai series, Denshi Sentai Denjiman, is heavily based on the Rawhide theme song.
 The jingle for the Rosen Motor Group used car dealership ("Rosen, Rosen, Rosen, Rosen, Rosen, Rosen") is based on the Rawhide theme.
 A series of mid-1990s advertisements for the Walmart chain that focus on its rolling back prices use a song based on the Rawhide theme.

Notable covers
Dan Sartain
101 Strings Orchestra
Big John Bates
The Blues Brothers (on the soundtrack to their eponymous film)
Johnny Cash
Frank Chacksfield and his Orchestra; the first bars of this instrumental version were used in a news jingle by Radio Veronica in the 1970s
Dezperadoz (The legend and the truth album, 2006)
Ensiferum
Greenbriar Boys
Happy Feet Two
Helgi Björnsson (Icelandic, as Ríðum, ríðum, ríðum)
The Jackson 5
Dead Kennedys
Frankie Laine (performed again with Jimmy Carroll and his orchestra); this version was used in an advertisement for Google Chrome in 2013
Litfiba (Pirata live album, 1989)
The Men They Couldn't Hang
The Meteors
Liza Minnelli
The New Zealand Railways Department used a cover of the song in a 1978 television advertisement for its freight services
Nassim (full name Nassim Ait-Kaci) recorded an instrumental version for the soundtrack of Tony Hawk's American Wasteland
Oingo Boingo
Riders in the Sky
Sheb Wooley (who actually starred in Rawhide)
Jan Rot translated the song in Dutch as "Yippieyayee" for the 2008 album An + Jan gaan landelijk
Sublime
Johnny Western
 The Chaps, 1982 Scottish novelty version (coupled with "Ghostriders in the Sky")
 The Survivors, 1965 Jamaican ska cover, released on UK label RIO Records

See also
Rawhide (TV series)
Fedora Rawhide, a development tree of Fedora Linux whose name was influenced by this song.

References

1958 songs
1958 singles
Dead Kennedys songs
Frankie Laine songs
Songs about cattle
Songs about cowboys and cowgirls
Songs with lyrics by Ned Washington
Songs with music by Dimitri Tiomkin
Television_theme_songs
The Blues Brothers songs
Western swing songs